Chris Chambers (born 1978), National Football League wide receiver.

Chris Chambers may also refer to:

Chris Chambers (ice hockey) (born 1986), American professional ice hockey player for Mississippi Surge
Chris Chambers, a fictional character from The Body (novella) (that was adapted into the film Stand By Me in 1986)
Chris Chambers, former deputy director of development for America's Army